Gisbert is a surname of Catalan origin.

People with the surname 

 Blaise Gisbert (1657–1731), French Jesuit rhetorician and critic
 Antonio Gisbert (1834–1901), Spanish artist
 Teresa Gisbert (1926–2018), Bolivian architect and historian
 Juan Gisbert, Sr. (born 1942), Spanish tennis player
 Joan Manuel Gisbert (born 1949), Spanish writer of children's literature
 Greg Gisbert (born 1966), American jazz trumpeter and flugelhornist

See also
 Gisbert Kapp (1852–1922), Austrian-English electrical engineer
 Gisbert Wüstholz, German mathematician

Catalan-language surnames